Foreign relations of the Republic of Somaliland are the responsibility of the Ministry of Foreign Affairs of the Republic of Somaliland. The region's self-declaration of independence (from Somalia on 18 May 1991, after the start of ongoing Somali Civil War) remains unrecognised by the international community.

Due to its status, the Republic of Somaliland currently has official contacts with only a few nations, such as Ethiopia, which has signed a strategic and infrastructure agreement, and the United Arab Emirates (UAE), which has signed a concession agreement to manage the Port of Berbera. Somaliland has established de facto embassies with nations such as the United States, as well as the Republic of China, also known as Taiwan. International recognition as a sovereign state remains at the forefront of the government's current foreign policy. Other key priorities include encouraging international aid and foreign direct investment.

Most multilateral organisations and countries in the international community support the territorial integrity (i.e. territorial unity) of Somalia and its central government, the Federal Government of Somalia during the ongoing civil war and oppose Somaliland's secession.

International relations

Somaliland has political contacts with neighbouring Ethiopia and Djibouti, as well as with Belgium, France, Ghana, Russia, South Africa, Sweden, the United Kingdom, and the United States.

In 2007, a delegation led by President Kahin was present at the Commonwealth Heads of Government Meeting in Kampala, Uganda. Although Somaliland has applied to join the Commonwealth under observer status, its application is still pending.

Middle East

Israel

Israel was one of 35 countries that recognised Somaliland's brief independence in 1960. However, it does not currently hold direct diplomatic ties with Somaliland. In February 2010, Israeli Foreign Ministry spokesperson Yigal Palmor was quoted in the Haaretz Daily that his government was ready to recognise Somaliland again. Although, he stated that the Somaliland government has not contacted the Israeli government to seek ties.

In 1995, former President Egal of Somaliland also wrote a letter to Prime Minister Yitzhak Rabin seeking to establish diplomatic ties between the two countries. In September 2001, it was also reported Somaliland was looking towards Tel Aviv after Saudi Arabia banned imports of livestock from the country due to Rift Valley fever. During this time several Israeli businessmen were also in the nation's capital Hargeisa. However, President Kahin who succeeded Egal is reported to have avoided approaching Israel to prevent straining fragile relations with the Arabs and Muslim world, which it heavily relies for its livestock trade. In August 2020, Somaliland expressed its support for the Israel–United Arab Emirates normalization agreement.

Turkey 
Though not recognising Somaliland and accrediting the building to Somalia, Turkey has an active consulate in Hargeisa. Since 2013 Turkey has been a mediator between Somali and Somaliland governments. In 2019 Somali Minister of Foreign Affairs Ahmed Isse Awad had stated that Turkey plays a leading role in the mediation process.

In 2012 Genel Enerji, an energy company mostly owned by Çukurova Holding had signed a deal with the Somaliland government to search oil reserves within the nation.

United Arab Emirates

In February 2017, both houses of the parliament of Somaliland accepted the bid from the government of the UAE for the Union Defence Force (UAE) to establish a military base in Berbera along with the redevelopment of the Berbera Airport. The United Arab Emirates has appointed a new representative to Somaliland which will be the first Arab nation to send a diplomat to Hargeisa. On 13 March 2021, Abdulla Al-Naqbi was appointed as UAE ambassador to Somaliland.

Africa
In 2011, the foreign ministers of South Africa and Tanzania said that they would not recognise Somaliland and preferred that Somalia remained a single country. In 2012, South Africa and Ethiopia again re-affirmed their continued support for Somalia's government, territorial integrity, and sovereignty at the mini-summit on Somalia in New York on the margins of the United Nations General Assembly. However, South Africa has formally declared that Somaliland fulfils the Montevideo Convention criteria for statehood in addition to it accepting the Somaliland passport.

The African Union (AU) is considering Somaliland's application for membership to the bloc and has indicated a willingness to deal with it as an 'outstanding case'.

Ethiopia

Somaliland has good (economic) relations with neighboring Ethiopia; since the Eritrean–Ethiopian War (1998–2000), a large part of Ethiopian exports has been handled via the port of Berbera, since Ethiopia can no longer use Eritrean ports (in Massaua and especially Assab). These relationships stand in contrast to the “traditional hostility” towards Ethiopia felt by many Somalis in other areas, and against the background of low support among many northern Somalis for Siad Barre's Ogaden War against Ethiopia and the Ethiopian-backed Somali National Movement. So far, however, these have not led to official Ethiopian recognition.

Guinea
 In late July 2019, Somaliland President Muse Bihi Abdi led a delegation to the Republic of Guinea at the invitation of President Alpha Conde.

Kenya

In December 2020, Kenya and Somaliland agreed that a Kenyan consulate would open in Hargeisa, and to commence direct flights between Hargeisa and Nairobi, both by March 2021.

Asia
In January 2018, Somaliland gained attention from the Philippines, and later East Timor, after legislation outlawing rape is successfully passed.

Pakistan
In November 2009, a Pakistani delegation composed of Sheikh Mansoor Ahmed, Secretary General of the ruling Pakistan Peoples Party, Shafiq Ahmed Qureshi, Peace Representative, former diplomat and Senior Consular Officer, and Abdul Razak Dinnaari, an ambassador, visited Somaliland and proposed the opening of a Somaliland trade office in Pakistan. In February 2020, Pakistan's Look Africa Policy Initiative conference was held in Nairobi, Kenya.

Taiwan (Republic of China)

 In July 2020, Somaliland announced it would establish a representative office in Taiwan (Republic of China). The Taiwan Representative Office officially established in Hargeisa the next month. In August, Taiwan opened its office in Somaliland which was reciprocated by Somaliland by opening an office in Taiwan on 9 September 2020.

Americas

United States

Somaliland and the United States do not have official diplomatic relations. However, Somaliland operates a representative liaison office in Washington, D.C., but it does not have formal diplomatic status under the provisions of the Vienna Convention on Diplomatic Relations. Both countries do maintain contacts as delegations from both sides have met in the past. The U.S. policy regarding Somaliland is to first allow the African Union to deliberate the question regarding the status of Somaliland as an independent nation.

The United States engages Somaliland on policy matters such as democratization and economic development. In 2007, the United States provided $1,000,000 in aid through the International Republican Institute to support training for parliamentarians and other key programs in preparations for the 2010 Somaliland presidential election. The U.S. expected to provide an additional $1,500,000 in continued support for the democratization process in Somaliland following the elections.

Europe

Germany

In 2002, Germany considered recognising Somaliland and establishing a military base in the country. They did not do so and the naval base was instead established in Djibouti. German naval ships already operated from Berbera. In September 2012, at the mini-summit on Somalia on the margins of the United Nations General Assembly, the German government re-affirmed its continued support for Somalia's government, territorial integrity and sovereignty. In 2019, the German ambassador to Kenya and Somalia visited Hargeisa and met with Muse Bihi Abdi.

United Kingdom

In April 2014, the Sheffield City Council in the United Kingdom voted to recognise the right to self-determination of Somaliland, the second British city council to do so, with Bristol being the first. The gesture however was ceremonial and not legally binding. On 26 March 2015, Cardiff City Council followed suit and later on 18 May 2015, the UK Independence Party announced their support for the recognition of Somaliland. This was followed by the Conservative UK government's official opening of a British Office in Hargeisa, the capital of Somaliland. In 2020, the United Kingdom, Denmark and the Netherlands approved four agreements with the government of Somaliland to improve critical infrastructure to support economic growth. In July 2019, the Birmingham City Council recognised the right to self-determination of Somaliland, becoming the 5th in Britain.

Foreign Minister

Dr. Essa Kayd serves as the Foreign Minister of Somaliland.

Diplomatic representative offices

Somaliland maintains representative (liaison) offices in several countries, but these missions do not have formal diplomatic status under the provisions of the Vienna Convention on Diplomatic Relations.

Such offices exist in the following cities:

 Addis Ababa
 Dubai, UAE<ref <ref [http://. 
 Paris
 Pretoria
 Stockholm
 Turin
 Washington D.C.
 Nairobi
 London
 Taipei

The following foreign governments have diplomatic offices in Hargeisa:
 – Consulate; headed by a diplomat with the rank of ambassador. It has an embassy in Mogadishu, Somalia's capital.
 – Consulate; headed by a diplomat with the rank of consul general
 – Consulate; headed by a diplomat with the rank of consul general
 – Liaison office
 – Programme office
 – Representative office

As of February 2010, the Yemeni government is reportedly planning to open a diplomatic office in Hargeisa.

Passports

Somaliland issues its own passports, recognised by certain nations. If and when Somaliland achieves its goal of recognition, a number of countries have stated that they will allow Somalilanders to travel to their countries, subject to visa regulations.

Organisational membership

Somaliland is a member of the Unrepresented Nations and Peoples Organization (UNPO).

See also

List of diplomatic missions of Somaliland
List of diplomatic missions in Somaliland
Foreign relations of Somalia

References

 
Separatism in Somalia